Tampico is a census-designated place and unincorporated community in Yakima County, Washington, United States, located approximately eighteen miles west of Yakima on Ahtanum Creek. The population was 312 at the 2010 United States Census.

History
The community was named Tampico by pioneer cattleman A. D. Elgin, for a town in Mexico where he once lived. Early pioneers settled in Tampico by at least 1872. By 1887, there were from 16 to 20 families living in the community.

Chief Kamiakin—who led the Yakama,  Palouse, and Klickitat in the Yakima War—was born at Ahtanum Creek near Tampico in 1800.  Near that site, St. Joseph's Mission was built in 1852, to be subsequently destroyed and rebuilt more than once; services are still regularly performed there.

Education
The community is served by West Valley School District 208.

References

Census-designated places in Yakima County, Washington
Census-designated places in Washington (state)
Northern Pacific Railway
Unincorporated communities in Yakima County, Washington
Unincorporated communities in Washington (state)